Riverwalk is the fourth album released by the flamenco-influenced Latin guitar instrumental duo Lara & Reyes.

Track listing
"Noches de San Miguel (San Miguel Nights)" – 5:10
"Black Mamba" – 5:15
"Solamente Una Vez/Amore (Amor, Amor, Amor)" – 4:28
"El Castillo (The Castle)" – 4:37
"River Road" – 4:08
"Milenio (Millennium)" – 4:06
"Satellite Island" – 3:43
"Romantique" – 4:14
"El Turco (The Turk)" – 4:42
"Pueblo Mágico (Magic Town)" – 5:52
"Olmos Park" – 3:28

References

1998 albums
Lara & Reyes albums
Higher Octave albums